Dubare is a forest camp on the banks of the river Kaveri in the district of Kodagu, Karnataka.

See also
 Suntikoppa
 Bylakuppe
 Kaveri Nisargadhama
 Kushalanagar

References 

Tourist attractions in Kodagu district
Elephant reserves of India
Wildlife sanctuaries in Karnataka